Rob Harbison (born June 27, 1966, in Fallston, Maryland) is an American sport shooter. He competed at the 1996 Summer Olympics in the men's 50 metre rifle three positions event, in which he placed sixth, and the men's 10 metre air rifle event, in which he placed seventh.

References

1966 births
Living people
ISSF rifle shooters
American male sport shooters
Shooters at the 1996 Summer Olympics
Olympic shooters of the United States
UT Martin Skyhawks rifle shooters
Pan American Games medalists in shooting
Pan American Games gold medalists for the United States
Pan American Games silver medalists for the United States
Shooters at the 1995 Pan American Games
20th-century American people
21st-century American people